Álvaro Gustavo Sarabia Navarro (born 5 January 1978) is a Chilean former footballer.

His last club was Deportes Puerto Montt, then member of the Primera B de Chile

Club career
Sarabia joined Colo-Colo lower divisions at early age, being promoted to the first adult team in 1997. In 2000, he moved to Arturo Fernández Vial of the Chilean second division.

In 2002, Sarabia signed for Puerto Montt, team of the Chilean Second Division in this time. He completed a good performance in the club, achieving the second division title, promoting to the Chilean Primera División.

His Primera División debut with Puerto Montt came on 2 March 2003, in a 1–0 home win to Palestino, and scored his first goal in Primera on 27 April against his former club Colo-Colo, in a 1–1 draw. Other important goal of Sarabia in the team was against other biggest club of Chile: Universidad Católica once in a 1–1 draw. In the next season, Sarabia scored 9 goals in 31 appearances in the all of season.

Sarabia lived his best moment of his career in the season 2005, being the goalscorer of the team and of the tournament with 13 goals. After of his Puerto Montt performances, he was transferred to the Mexican club Chiapas.

In Jaguares de Chiapas, Sarabia only scored 1 goal in 12 appearances, returning to Chile to play with Palestino the Torneo de Apertura 2006. In his club debut against Coquimbo Unido, he scored in the 3–1 victory to this club. However, he only scored 3 goals in 6 games, due to an injury that he suffered. In the Clausura, he did not play in all tournaments. In the next season, he played few games with the club, being transferred to Rangers de Talca in 2008.

International career
Sarabia represented Chile at under-20 level in the 1997 South American Championship.

Personal life
Following his retirement, he made his home in Dalcahue, Los Lagos Region, and has worked as a chauffeur.

Honours

Individual
 Primera División de Chile Top-scorer (1): 2005 Apertura

References

External links
Sarabia at Football Lineups

1978 births
Living people
Footballers from Santiago
Chilean footballers
Chilean expatriate footballers
Chile under-20 international footballers
Chilean Primera División players
Primera B de Chile players
Liga MX players
Colo-Colo footballers
C.D. Arturo Fernández Vial footballers
Puerto Montt footballers
Chiapas F.C. footballers
Club Deportivo Palestino footballers
Rangers de Talca footballers
Lota Schwager footballers
Chilean expatriate sportspeople in Mexico
Expatriate footballers in Mexico
Association football forwards